The Great Lacuna is a lacuna of eight leaves where there was heroic Old Norse poetry in the Codex Regius. The gap would have contained the last part of Sigrdrífumál and most of Sigurðarkviða. What remains of the last poem consists of 22 stanzas called Brot af Sigurðarkviðu, but according to Henry Adams Bellows, the original size of Sigurðarkviða should have been more than 250 stanzas.

The missing original narrative is preserved in the Völsunga saga in prose form with four stanzas of poetry. The first two stanzas that are preserved through the saga deal with how Sigurd returns to Brynhildr leaping through the flames on Grani after Gunnar had failed:

Sigurd had, however, been given a potion of forgetfulness and so he had forgotten all about Brynhildr before returning to her. Moreover, he arrived to her disguised as Gunnar, and so Brynhildr was married to Gunnar instead. After the wedding, Brynhildr argues with her sister-in-law Gudrun, who is Sigurd's spouse, and Gudrun reveals to Brynhildr that it was Sigurd who saved her from her prison. Brynhildr who grasps the extent of the treachery of her in-laws (the Gjukungs) against her and Sigurd, speaks out her heart about Gunnar, in the third preserved stanza:

Brynhildr is furious and so Gunnar and Sigurd talk to her trying to calm her down. Sigurd and Brynhildr have a conversation about the treachery of their mutual in-laws, and understanding how deceived he has been, Sigurd leaves Brynhildr with a heavy heart:

Brynhild's fury would soon lead to the death of both her and Sigurd and to the end of the Gjukung clan.

J. R. R. Tolkien produced the poems Sigurðarkvida en nyja and Guðrunarkviða en nyja, now published as The Legend of Sigurd and Gudrún, based on the content found in the saga.

Notes

References 
 The Great Lacuna Stanzas from Völsunga saga believed to be from the lacuna, translated by Lee M. Hollander
 Fragment of a Sigurth Lay Henry Adams Bellows' translation and commentary
 Fragments of the Lay of Sigurd and Brynhild Benjamin Thorpe's translation

Eddic poetry
Nibelung tradition
Sources of Norse mythology
Lost literature